Annie Brilland (born 10 December 1956) is a retired French actress and social worker. Her acting career began in 1974. Throughout the 1970s and 1980s she had varied roles in both French and Italian cinema, working with such directors as Jean Rollin, Ruggero Deodato and Joe D'Amato.

Life and career

Early life
Belle was born in Paris, France and came from a family of engineers.  Acting may have seemed to be an odd career choice for her when she was young but she was quite a natural at it.  Belle's acting career began to take shape when she attended the Rue Blanche acting school in Paris under master Virilo.  Belle explained this in an interview for the Italian book 99 Donne in the 1990s.

Films
Belle had starred in her first role before she had turned eighteen, in the 1974 Jean Rollin film Tout le Monde il en a Deux (Bacchanales Sexuelles) in which she only had a small role, but a memorable one.  Rollin had loved working with Belle so he had decided to cast her in his 1975 film Lévres de Sang (Lips of Blood). Those were her only times working with the director.  Not long after filming Lévres de Sang, Belle moved to Italy and for a brief time became one of the most in demand actresses in Italian exploitation cinema, having starred in three major films in 1976 alone: Forever Emmanuelle, Blue Belle, and Velluto Nero. Blue Belle was one of the key points in Belle's career, a film in which she had a co-writing credit, calling the director of the movie, Massimo Dallamano, "a great professional and a talented man".  One of Belle's most controversial films was Velluto Nero.  Belle remembers Forever Emmanuelle as a "not very good" film.

In the early 1980s, Belle starred in Italian films The House on the Edge of the Park, which she remembers as being very "cruel" and also very "interesting" and two Joe D'Amato films, Absurd and L'alcova.

Personal problems slowed Belle's acting career down in the 1980s. In 1989 she starred in her final film Fuga dalla morte and then she retired from acting.

Other work
Since returning to France, Belle went to school and received a degree in psychology and is now a social worker for people diagnosed with mental illness.

Personal life
Belle had a three-year relationship with actor Al Cliver. It lasted between 1975 and 1978, during which they acted in four films together, Belle's three films from 1976, Forever Emmanuelle, Blue Belle and Velluto Nero and her 1977 film Un Giorno alla fine di Ottobre.  After their split they occasionally acted together in films such as Molto di più and L'alcova.

Filmography

References

External links
 
 Annie Belle at Yahoo! Movies
 Annie Belle at Flixster
 Annie Belle at Film.com
 Annie Belle at MovieTome
 

1956 births
French film actresses
French television actresses
Living people
Actresses from Paris
French social workers
20th-century French actresses